This is a list of 109 species in Stizus, a genus of sand wasps in the family Crabronidae.

Stizus species

 Stizus adelphus W.F. Kirby, 1900 i c g
 Stizus aegyptius Lepeletier, 1845 i c g
 Stizus aestivalis Mercet, 1906 i c g
 Stizus anchoratus Mantero, 1917 i c g
 Stizus annulatus (Klug, 1845) i c g
 Stizus apicalis Guérin-Méneville, 1844 i c g
 Stizus arabicus Guichard, 1989 i c g
 Stizus arnoldi Mochi, 1939 i c g
 Stizus atrox (F. Smith, 1856) i c g
 Stizus aurifluus R. Turner, 1916 i c g
 Stizus aztecus Stubblefield, 1984 i c g
 Stizus basalis Guérin-Méneville, 1844 i c g
 Stizus baumanni Handlirsch, 1901 i c g
 Stizus beccarii Mantero, 1917 i c g
 Stizus bensoni Arnold, 1951 i c g
 Stizus berlandi Arnold, 1945 i c g
 Stizus biclipeatus (Christ, 1791) i c g
 Stizus bipunctatus (F. Smith, 1856) i c g
 Stizus bizonatus Spinola, 1839 i c g
 Stizus brevipennis Walsh, 1869 i c g b
 Stizus breyeri Arnold, 1936 i c g
 Stizus chrysorrhoeus Handlirsch, 1892 i c g
 Stizus cinctus (Fabricius, 1793) i c g
 Stizus coloratus Nurse, 1903 i c g
 Stizus combustus (F. Smith, 1856) i c g
 Stizus continuus (Klug, 1835) i c g
 Stizus delessertii Guérin-Méneville, 1844 i c g
 Stizus deserticus Giner Marí, 1945 i c g
 Stizus dewitzii Handlirsch, 1892 i c g
 Stizus dispar F. Morawitz, 1888 i c g
 Stizus elegans Dahlbom, 1845 i c g
 Stizus ellenbergeri Arnold, 1929 i c g
 Stizus emir Handlirsch, 1901 i c g
 Stizus erythraeensis Mantero, 1917 i c g
 Stizus erythrocephalus (Fabricius, 1793) i c g
 Stizus euchromus Handlirsch, 1892 i c g
 Stizus excellens Lohrmann, 1943 i c g
 Stizus eximius F. Morawitz, 1894 i c g
 Stizus fasciatus (Fabricius, 1781) i c g
 Stizus fedtschenkoi Radoszkowski, 1877 i c g
 Stizus ferrandii Magretti, 1899 i c g
 Stizus franzi R. Turner, 1916 i c g
 Stizus fulvicornis Dahlbom, 1845 i c g
 Stizus fuscatus Morice, 1897 i c g
 Stizus fuscipennis (F. Smith, 1856) i c g
 Stizus hamatus Arnold, 1929 i c g
 Stizus handlirschi Radoszkowski, 1893 i c g
 Stizus hispanicus Mocsáry, 1883 i c g
 Stizus histrio F. Morawitz, 1888 i c g
 Stizus huegelii Handlirsch, 1892 i c g
 Stizus hyalipennis Handlirsch, 1892 i c g
 Stizus imperator Nurse, 1903 i c g
 Stizus imperialis Handlirsch, 1892 i c g
 Stizus iridis Dow, 1941 i c g
 Stizus jordanicus Lohrmann, 1942 i c g
 Stizus koenigi F. Morawitz, 1888 i c g
 Stizus kohlii Mocsáry, 1883 i c g
 Stizus lacteipennis Mocsáry, 1883 i c g
 Stizus lepidus (Klug, 1845) i c g
 Stizus lineatus (Fabricius, 1793) i c
 Stizus lohrmanni R. Bohart, 1976 i c g
 Stizus lughensis Magretti, 1899 i c g
 Stizus luteotaeniatus Gussakovskij, 1933 i c g
 Stizus marnonis Handlirsch, 1892 i c g
 Stizus marshallii R. Turner, 1912 i c g
 Stizus marthae Handlirsch, 1892 i c g
 Stizus melanurus Handlirsch, 1892 i c g
 Stizus mocsaryi Handlirsch, 1895 i c g
 Stizus multicolor R. Turner, 1916 i c g
 Stizus nadigi Roth, 1933 i c g
 Stizus neavei R. Turner, 1912 i c g
 Stizus nigriventris Arnold, 1951 i c g
 Stizus niloticus Handlirsch, 1892 i c g
 Stizus occidentalis J. Parker, 1929 i c g b
 Stizus ocellatus Gistel, 1857 i c g
 Stizus orientalis Cameron, 1890 i c g
 Stizus ornatus Dahlbom, 1845 i c g
 Stizus pauli Mantero, 1917 i c g
 Stizus perrisi Dufour, 1838 i c g
 Stizus pictus Dahlbom, 1845 i c g
 Stizus praestans F. Morawitz, 1893 i c g
 Stizus pubescens (Klug, 1835) i c g
 Stizus quartinae Gribodo, 1884 i c g
 Stizus raddei Handlirsch in Kohl and Handlirsch, 1889 c g
 Stizus rapax Handlirsch, 1892 i c g
 Stizus richardsi Arnold, 1959 i c g
 Stizus rubellus R. Turner, 1912 i c g
 Stizus rubroflavus R. Turner, 1916 i c g
 Stizus rufescens (F. Smith, 1856) i c g
 Stizus ruficornis (J. Forster, 1771) i c g
 Stizus rufipes (Fabricius, 1804) i c g
 Stizus rufiventris Radoszkowski, 1877 i c g
 Stizus rufocinctus Dahlbom, 1845 i c g
 Stizus rufoniger Mochi, 1939 i c g
 Stizus saussurei Handlirsch, 1895 i c g
 Stizus savignyi Spinola, 1839 i c g
 Stizus schmiedeknechti Handlirsch, 1898 i c g
 Stizus sexfasciatus (Fabricius, 1793) i c g
 Stizus spectrum Handlirsch, 1901 i c g
 Stizus spinulosus Radoszkowski, 1876 i c g
 Stizus tenuicornis (F. Smith, 1856) i c g
 Stizus texanus Cresson, 1873 i c g
 Stizus tricolor Handlirsch, 1892 i c g
 Stizus tunetanus A. Costa, 1893 i c g
 Stizus vespiformis (Fabricius, 1775) i c g
 Stizus vespoides (Walker, 1871) i c g
 Stizus wheeleri Arnold, 1959 i c g
 Stizus zonatus (Klug, 1845) i c g
 Stizus zonosoma Handlirsch, 1895 i c g

Data sources: i = ITIS, c = Catalogue of Life, g = GBIF, b = Bugguide.net

References

Stizus